Nick Haramis (born March 10, 1983) is a Canadian-born, American journalist and magazine editor. He is currently the editor-in-chief for Interview magazine. He previously was the Senior Features Editor, T: The New York Times Style Magazine from 2013–2017.

Biography 
Haramis was born in Cornwall, Ontario, Canada in 1983. He graduated from McGill University in 2007 with a degree in English Literature.

After two years as the Editor of BlackBook, in September 2011 Haramis accepted the position of Editorial Director at Bullett, a quarterly arts, fashion, and culture publication based in New York City. There he interviewed high-profile subjects at various stages in their careers, such as Winona Ryder, Bill Murray, Kirsten Dunst, and Nicki Minaj.

He has contributed to publications such as The Last Magazine, S Magazine, Billboard Magazine, The Wall Street Journal, Playboy and Reader's Digest. Haramis is also a regular on the downtown New York nightlife scene.

Personal life 
Haramis is based in the Bushwick neighborhood of Brooklyn, New York with his boyfriend, Misha Kahn.

References

External links
BlackBook Magazine

American male journalists
American editors
McGill University alumni
1983 births
Living people
Canadian emigrants to the United States